Edward James Adamchik (born November 2, 1941) is a former professional American football offensive lineman in the National Football League (NFL).

References

External links

Sportspeople from Johnstown, Pennsylvania
Players of American football from Pennsylvania
American football offensive guards
American football centers
Pittsburgh Steelers players
New York Giants players
Pittsburgh Panthers football players
University of Pittsburgh alumni
1941 births
Living people